is a Fukui Railway Fukubu Line railway station located in the city of Echizen, Fukui Prefecture, Japan.

Lines
There are several bus lines operating from a rotary near the south exit and stops by the west exit.

Station layout
The station consists of two bay platforms serving three tracks, with a three-story station building. The station is staffed.

Adjacent stations

History
A new station building was completed in 1983.

With the opening of the Hokuriku Shinkansen extension to Tsuruga, it was decided that one of the new Shinkansen stations would be given the name 'Echizen-Takefu Station'. As the station name is also being used by Fukui Railways, a poll was conducted to choose a new name for this station. Besides the reverting the station name back to 'Takefu-Shin Station', the 5 other suggests were 'Fukutetsu-Takefu Station', 'Fukutetsu-Echizen Station', 'Kikuka-Takefu Station', and 'Echizen-Fuchu Station'. The results of the poll was to rename this station to Takefu-shin Station with 'Takefu' being written in hiragana rather than kanji. This came into effect on February 25, 2023.

Surrounding area
Various government facilities including Echizen City Hall and municipal library are nearby.
The AL.PLAZA supermarket is just outside the station's front entrance.
Takefu Station on the JR West Hokuriku Main Line is located 250 meters to the south.
Echizen-Takefu Station on the JR West Hokuriku Shinkansen which is going to open in 2024 is located 5 km to the east.

See also
 List of railway stations in Japan

References

External links

  

Railway stations in Fukui Prefecture
Railway stations in Japan opened in 1924
Fukui Railway Fukubu Line
Echizen, Fukui